Zvodno is a settlement in the City Municipality of Celje in eastern Slovenia. It lies on the southeastern outskirts of Celje. The area is part of the traditional region of Styria. It is now included with the rest of the municipality in the Savinja Statistical Region.

Name
The name Zvodno is a clipped form from *Zvodno (selo) 'Zvodno village', in which the first element is an adjective derived from zvod 'confluence', referring to the geographical location of the settlement. Zvodno is located at the confluence of Devil's Creek and the Ločnica River.

Mass grave
Zvodno is the site of a mass grave from the period immediately after the Second World War. It is part of the 25 mass graves in the Celje area. The shaft has a 35% grade and has also been backfilled and leveled with the terrain. The grave contains the corpses of 5,000 to 10,000 people killed or executed in May and June 1945.

References

External links
Zvodno on Geopedia

Populated places in the City Municipality of Celje